Isopropenyl acetate is an organic compound, which is the acetate ester of the enol tautomer of acetone.  This colorless liquid is significant commercially as the principal precursor to acetylacetone.  In organic synthesis, it is used to prepare enol acetates of ketones and acetonides from diols.

Preparation and reactions
Isopropenyl acetate is prepared by treating acetone with ketene. Upon heating over a metal surface, isopropenyl acetate rearranges to acetylacetone.

Isopropenyl acetate is used to prepare other isopropenyl esters by transesterification.

References

Acetate esters
Isopropenyl esters